In biochemistry, an oxidase is an enzyme that catalyzes oxidation-reduction reactions, especially one involving dioxygen (O2) as the electron acceptor. In reactions involving donation of a hydrogen atom, oxygen is reduced to water (H2O) or hydrogen peroxide (H2O2). Some oxidation reactions, such as those involving monoamine oxidase or xanthine oxidase, typically do not involve free molecular oxygen.

The oxidases are a subclass of the oxidoreductases.

Examples
An important example is cytochrome c oxidase, the key enzyme that allows the body to employ oxygen in the generation of energy and the final component of the electron transfer chain. Other examples are:
 Glucose oxidase
 Monoamine oxidase
 Cytochrome P450 oxidase
 NADPH oxidase
 Xanthine oxidase
 L-gulonolactone oxidase
 Laccase
 Lysyl oxidase
 Polyphenol oxidase
 Sulfhydryl oxidase. This enzyme oxidises thiol groups.

Oxidase test

In microbiology, the oxidase test is used as a phenotypic characteristic for the identification of bacterial strains; it determines whether a given bacterium produces cytochrome oxidases (and therefore utilizes oxygen with an electron transfer chain).

The test is used to determine whether a bacterium is an aerobe or anaerobe. However a bacterium that is Oxidase negative is not necessarily anaerobic, instead showing the bacterium does not possess cytochrome c oxidase.

References

External links
 Catalase & Oxidase tests video
 

Oxidoreductases